Bulaimu Muwanga Kibirige, (2 October 1953 – 10 September 2021), commonly known as BMK, was a Ugandan businessman, entrepreneur, and hotel owner. According to a 2012 published report, he was one of the wealthiest people in Uganda.

Background
In 1997, BMK started with the 40-room motel Hotel Africana, on Kololo Hill, which is within Kampala's central business district. During the next decade, the hotel grew into a four-star establishment.

Business interests
BMK was the chairman and managing director of the BMK Group of companies, whose member businesses include:

1. Hotel Africana Kampala, 2-4 Wampewo Avenue, Kololo Hill, Kampala, Uganda

2. Hotel Africana Moroto, Moroto City, Uganda

3. Hotel Africana Lusaka, Lusaka, Zambia

4. BMK Motorcycles (U) Limited, Nateete, Kampala, Uganda

5. BMK Motorcycles (K) Limited, Nairobi, Kenya

6. BMK Motorcycles (T) Limited, Dar es Salaam, Tanzania

7. BMK Motorcycles (R) Limited, Kigali, Rwanda

8. BMK Motorcycles (Z) Limited, Lusaka, Zambia

9. Hotel Africana Forex Bureau 1, 2-4 Wampewo Avenue, Kampala, Uganda

10. Hotel Africana Forex Bureau 2, 16-18 William Street, Kampala, Uganda

11. BMK Construction Leasing Company, Kigali, Rwanda

12. BMK Oil Equipment Company, Kampala, Uganda

Other responsibilities
BMK served in the following public positions:

1. Chairman of the Uganda Hotel Owners Association

2. Board member of the Ugandan North American Association

3. Chairman Executive Board for Uganda Sickle Cell Rescue Foundation

Illness and death
BMK had been battling cancer for some time before his death. He was admitted to a hospital in Nairobi, Kenya, for some time, before he died there on 10 September 2021, at the age of 67.

See also 

List of wealthiest people in Uganda
List of conglomerates in Uganda

References

External links
Hotel Africana Homepage

1953 births
2021 deaths
Ugandan businesspeople
People from Kampala District
Ganda people
Ugandan Muslims
Ugandan business executives
Ugandan chief executives